APFC may refer to:

 Active/automatic power factor correction/control (panel), used to control the power factor of electrical loads
 Alaska Permanent Fund Corporation
 Albert Park Football Club, a present-day amateur Australian rules football club
 Albert Park Football Club (VFA), a former Australian rules football club from the 1860s and 1870s
 Annfield Plain F.C.
 Assistant provident fund commissioner in Employees' Provident Fund Organisation of India
 National Football League, professional American football league, originally named the APFC

See also
 Asia-Pacific Fishery Commission (APFIC)